Silver Falls Water Aerodrome  is located  south of Silver Falls, Manitoba, Canada.

See also
Silver Falls Airport

References

Registered aerodromes in Manitoba
Seaplane bases in Manitoba

Transport in Eastman Region, Manitoba